Campbell Park is the name of the central park for Milton Keynes (England) and of a ward of Central Milton Keynes civil parish. (The nearby Campbell Park (civil parish) previously included the park but no longer does so. It did not change its name after the park district was transferred to CMK Town Council).

The park is listed (grade 2) "due to its historic interest and innovative architectural design".

The Park
The park, part of Central Milton Keynes civil parish (rather than Campbell Park CP), takes up the larger part of the district. It was named in honour of the first chairman of Milton Keynes Development Corporation, Jock Campbell, Baron Campbell of Eskan. It is accessed from the main retail/service/entertainment district by a footbridge over the Marlborough Street (B4146, V8) cutting, at the end of Midsummer Boulevard. From here, the park slopes downwards to the Grand Union Canal. A junction between the Grand Union and a new Bedford & Milton Keynes Waterway is proposed for this area.

The park is listed (grade 2) by Historic England, and had previously attracted praise in the Pevsner Architectural Guides:

Milton Keynes Rose
The Rose, at the west end of the park and nearest to the MK's central business district, "is a public space designed for commemoration, celebration and contemplation". As well as a central Cenotaph, the installation includes markers for a wide variety of historical events.

When Queen Elizabeth II died in September 2022, the MK Rose was used by locals as a place to lay floral tributes.

Belvedere and Pyramid of Light
Leading east from the Rose, the Belvedere is level path leading to Pyramid of Light, a sculpture. The ground on either side falls away so that most of the path is on an increasingly elevated embankment.

The Pyramid of Light also serves as a beacon and was most recently lit during the 2022 Platinum Jubilee of Queen Elizabeth II

Events plateau and amphitheatre
These spaces are used for community events and biennially for IF: Milton Keynes, the Milton Keynes International Festival.

This area is also known for hosting Milton Keynes-based events such as India Day and the African Diaspora Foundation Festival.

The amphitheatre has also hosted concerts featuring acts such as Steps, Paloma Faith, and Will Young.

Cricket ground
Campbell Park Cricket Ground and its pavilion lie at the east end of the park, near the Grand Union Canal.

Parks Trust headquarters
The Milton Keynes Parks Trust has its headquarters building at the eastern end of the park, near the cricket ground.

References

External links 
 Campbell Park by The Parks Trust (includes link to highlights video)
Parks and open spaces in the Borough of Milton Keynes